Peter Urusov or Ouroussoff may refer to:

 Peter Arslanovich Urusov, a Tatar prince who killed False Dmitry II in 1610
 Pyotr Vasilyevich Ouroussoff, co-founder of the Bolshoi Ballet in 1776